Sir Alexander Robert Loftus Tottenham CIE (31 July 1873 – 13 December 1946) was a British civil servant and administrator who served as the Diwan of Pudukkottai state from 1934 to 1944.

Early life 

Alexander Tottenham was born to British naval officer John Francis Tottenham and his wife Laura Ellen Dodd Janverin on 31 July 1873. Alexander graduated from Clifton College, Bristol and did his post-graduation from Queen's College, Oxford.

Career 

Alexander passed the 1896 Indian Civil Service examinations and arrived in India on 5 December 1897 where he served as  District Collector and Assistant Magistrate in the Madras Presidency. From 1923 to 1932, he was as a member of India's Central Board of Revenue. Alexander retired from the Indian Civil Service in 1933 at the age of sixty.

Pudukkottai 

In 1934, Tottenham was appointed Diwan of Pudukkottai and he served until his death in 1946. Tottenham is regarded as one of the best administrators of Pudukkottai and promoted arts and industry. A portrait of Alexander Tottenham hangs in the Government Museum, Thirukokarnam.

Notes

Biographies 

 

1873 births
1946 deaths
People educated at Clifton College
Knights Bachelor
Companions of the Order of the Indian Empire
Pudukkottai state
Indian Civil Service (British India) officers
British people in colonial India